Claude Jourdan (18 June 1803, in Heyrieux – 12 February 1873, in Lyon) was a French zoologist and paleontologist.

In Lyon he was a professor of zoology to the Faculté des sciences, and a professor of comparative anatomy at the École des Beaux-Arts. From 1832 to 1869 he was director of the Musée d'histoire naturelle - Guimet in Lyons.

As a zoologist, he conducted studies of living and extinct vertebrates, including Proboscidea (elephants and their ancestors). In 1840–48 he is credited with uncovering 2000 fossils at various excavation sites in France. As a taxonomist, he described Acerodon, a genus of Old World fruit bats, and Hemigalus, a monospecific genus associated with the banded palm civet, Hemigalus derbyanus. He also classified the following mammal species:
 Golden Atlantic tree-rat, Phyllomys blainvilii.
 Western brush wallaby, Macropus irma.
In 1839 Jules Bourcier named the rufous-shafted woodstar, Chaetocercus jourdanii, after him. It is sometimes referred to as "Jourdan's woodstar".

Published works 
 Mémoire sur un nouveau genre de Lémurien. 1834.
 Mémoires sur deux mammifères nouveaux de l'Inde, 1837.
 Mémoires sur un rongeur fossile des calcaires d'eau douce du centre de la France, 1837. 
 Mémoire sur cinq mammifères nouveaux, 1837. 
 Note géologique et paléontologique sur une partie de l'Ardèche. 
 Descriptions de restes fossiles de deux grands mammifères des terrains sidérolitiques. 
 Description d'ossements de l'Ormenalurus agilis, 1866.

References 

1803 births
1873 deaths
French zoologists
French paleontologists
People from Isère
Academic staff of the University of Lyon